Brampton—Springdale was a provincial electoral district in central Ontario, Canada. It was created for the 2007 provincial election. 83.7% of the district was created from Brampton Centre while 16.3% was carved from Bramalea—Gore—Malton—Springdale.

The riding includes that part of Brampton west of a line following Dixie Road to Bovaird Drive to Torbram Road and east of a line following Hurontario Street to Vodden Street to Kennedy Road.

In 2018, the district was dissolved into Brampton Centre, Brampton North and Brampton East.

Members of Provincial Parliament

Election results

2007 electoral reform referendum

Sources

Elections Ontario Past Election Results

Former provincial electoral districts of Ontario
Politics of Brampton